Abram Mikhaylovich Lufer (born in Kiev, 25 August 1905 - died in Kiev, 13 July 1948) was a Ukrainian pianist.

Biography
Abram Lufer was born on 25 August 1905 in Kiev, he took musical education in the Kiev Music School in 1925 under Grigory Beklemishev, then studying at the Lysenko Musical Institute and graduating in 1928. The following year he was the head of the piano department there.

In 1930, he won the All-Ukrainian Piano Competition in Kharkov and was appointed the National Philharmonic Society of Ukraine's soloist. Two years later he was awarded a 4th prize at the II International Chopin Piano Competition - having tied with Bolesław Kon, the 3rd prize winner, but he lost at the coin flipping. His disciple Tatyana Goldfarb was awarded a 9th prize at the competition's next edition.

Lufer was appointed head director of the Kiev Conservatory in 1934, Lufer supported a three-staged musical education system in Ukraine, and created a music school in Kiev for gifted children, under the support of the Kiev Conservatory. This brought more people to the Kiev Conservatory, and with higher student counts and a need for higher concert activity, Lufer renovated and expanded the conservatory, a government-funded concert hall was built with 850 seats. By the time of the conservatory's 25th anniversary in 1938, Lufer created the folk instrument and music department as the 6th department in the conservatory, along with a choir and opera studio and a postgraduate program, one of the earliest in the USSR.

When the Kiev Conservatory was being invaded by Germany in 1941, Lufer and most of the institute moved to the Sverdlovsk Oblast, he was replaced by Viktor Ivanovsky initially, but due to sickness Ivanovsky couldn't hold the post, and was replaced by Ostap Lysenko.

By June 1944, when the occupation ended, Lufer went back to the conservatory and resumed his position as the director.

In 1945, during the Soviet Union control of Germany, the Sing-Akademie zu Berlin was looted, with most of its collection being transported to either Kiev or Moscow, Lufer saw over the musical artifacts, and on 23 October 1945, he went to Germany to examine the Soviet findings of the Sing-Akademie Archive, 10 days later large parts of the archive were controversially moved into the Kiev Conservatory, which were analysed and kept.

On 13 July 1948, while still directing the Kiev Conservatory, Lufer died in Kiev.

References

Ukrainian classical pianists
Male classical pianists
1905 births
1948 deaths
Musicians from Kyiv
Prize-winners of the International Chopin Piano Competition
20th-century classical pianists
20th-century composers
20th-century male musicians
Soviet pianists